SS Prunelle was a British cargo ship that the German submarine SM UB-112 torpedoed on 22 August 1918 in the North Sea  south east of Blyth, Northumberland. Prunelle was carrying a cargo of jute from London, United Kingdom, to Dundee, Scotland, United Kingdom.

Construction 
Prunelle was built at the Bergsund Mekaniske Verksted shipyard in Stockholm, Sweden in 1874. Where she was launched and completed that same year. The ship could reach a maximum speed of 8 knots.

Sinking 
Prunelle left London and set sail for Dundee on 22 August 1918 with a crew of 16 and a cargo of jute on board. One of the crew members, second officer Alfred Cheetham had served on four Antarctic expeditions: Captain Robert Scott's Discovery Expedition and Terra Nova expedition and on Ernest Shackleton's Nimrod and Imperial Trans-Antarctic expeditions.

The U-boat fired a torpedo at the ship without warning and the torpedo hit the ship on the port side near the engine room. The following explosion and rapid sinking of the ship killed 12 of the 16 crewmen on board including Captain Storm and second officer Cheetham. The four survivors were rescued shortly after, having clung themselves to the ships wreckage, and were brought ashore at Blyth.

Wreck 

References

1874 ships
Ships built in Stockholm
Steamships of Sweden
Merchant ships of Sweden
Steamships of Norway
Merchant ships of Norway
Steamships of the United Kingdom
World War I merchant ships of the United Kingdom
World War I shipwrecks in the North Sea
Maritime incidents in 1918